George William Bailey (29 April 1906 – 24 July 2000) was an English athlete who competed for Great Britain in the 1932 Summer Olympics. He was born in Buxton.

In 1932 he finished fifth in the 3000 metre steeplechase event. In the 5000 metres competition he was eliminated in the first round. At the 1930 Empire Games he won the gold medal in the 2 miles steeplechase competition and in the 1934 Empire Games he won the bronze medal in the 2 miles steeplechase contest. In the 1950s he was an early mentor to John Tarrant, the Ghost Runner.

References

External links

1906 births
2000 deaths
People from Buxton
Sportspeople from Derbyshire
English male steeplechase runners
British male steeplechase runners
Olympic athletes of Great Britain
Athletes (track and field) at the 1932 Summer Olympics
Commonwealth Games gold medallists for England
Commonwealth Games bronze medallists for England
Commonwealth Games medallists in athletics
Athletes (track and field) at the 1930 British Empire Games
Athletes (track and field) at the 1934 British Empire Games
Medallists at the 1930 British Empire Games
Medallists at the 1934 British Empire Games